Outlaw Tennis is a video game based on the sport of tennis published for the Xbox and PlayStation 2, and the last game in the Outlaw series to be released in 2005. Actor and political satirist Stephen Colbert provides the voice of the game's announcer.

Game modes
 Quick Play- The player picks the court and difficulty, the game automatically picks an opponent. This is a quick way to get into a Classic Tennis Match without having to sort through all the options.
 Exhibition- This mode is a quick way for a player to get into a game of tennis, with 7 different Play Styles to choose from, and 12 customizable Play Style Settings to tailor the game to the player's wishes.
There are two Match Types Available in this mode, Singles (1 vs 1) or Canadian Doubles (1 vs 2). When Advantage is turned on at deuce (40-40), one player has to win the game. The player who wins the next point takes the game. If Win by 2 Games is turned on, at 5-5, the player must then win by two games, however at 6-6, a tiebreak is played to determine who wins the set. The tiebreak rules are the first player to reach seven points win the tiebreak and set, at 6 points all, the player who wins two consecutive points wins the tiebreak and the set. The Games per set option allows the player to choose the number of games to win a set. The minimum is two games and the maximum is 6. Sets per Match determines how many sets are in the match. As with typical tennis, 1, 3, or 5 sets can be played. A1 difficulty determines the hardness of the game. The default level is Pro, however the player can set the level at Amateur for newer players or Veteran for the big time tennis players. When Time Bombs are turned on every 5 seconds or so whoever last hit the ball will get blown up with the time bomb. Whenever smoke appears the player needs to get the ball back on the other side of the court before they get blown away. Team Match Timer when turned on, is much like a chess clock whereas once the ball is hit the time stops but when the opponent returns the shot, it begins again. The match timer can also be enabled. Whoever is in the lead when time runs up wins. Challenges are set by the empire, Heavy G. When turned on at the beginning of the match, Heavy G will present a challenge which ever play wins the challenge first receives 30-seconds of unlimited turbo. The Outlaw Blockers is a malicious square of digital fiberglass that slides back and forth along the net. Known as the great equalizer, the player can try to avoid it, or try timing it, but it will ultimately best the player. Weather can also be switched on or off. When turned on there is a chance for rain or snow.

 Tour Mode- This mode is where the player unlocks characters, courts, clothing, accessories, racquets, and Drill Events. The player must take each Outlaw (character) and win five events. With 80 events, bonus videos, courts, and characters are unlocked. For the double events, a second player can be invited to help out.
 Outlaw Drills- Allows the player to improve their character's skills. This is essential when playing the Tour Mode. Through games that work on Serve, Accuracy, Power, Speed, Control, and Endurance, the player will need to improve on their abilities to make it through the big leagues on Tour Mode.

Reception

The game was met with average reception.  GameRankings and Metacritic gave it a score of 70% and 66 out of 100 for the Xbox version, and 69% and 67 out of 100 for the PlayStation 2 version.

Detroit Free Press gave the PS2 version a score of three stars out of four and stated that "The online features, variety of characters and deep play modes [make] Outlaw Tennis a keeper -- especially at its cheap price." However, The Sydney Morning Herald gave the Xbox version a score of three-and-a-half stars out of five and said, "The outrageous characters, puerile gags and crass commentary provide chuckles but the jokes soon become stale. Player reactions after each point also quickly become tiresome."  Maxim gave both versions of the game three stars out of five and stated that the game "plays as well as a regulation tennis game. It has the same responsive controls, and even lets you play online doubles with your friends -- assuming they're more likely to chug a Country Club than apply to one."

References

External links
 

Tennis video games
2005 video games
PlayStation 2 games
Xbox games
Video games developed in the United States
Video games featuring female protagonists
Global Star Software games
Multiplayer and single-player video games